Cychrus cordithorax is a species of ground beetle in the subfamily of Carabinae. It was described by Deuve in 2007.

References

cordithorax
Beetles described in 2007